933 Susi is a minor planet orbiting the Sun.

The object 1911 LX discovered 22 April 1911, by H. E. Wood was named 715 Transvaalia. On 23 April 1920, the object 1920 GZ was discovered and named 933 Susi. In 1928 it was realized that these were one and the same object. The name Transvaalia was kept, and the name and number 933 Susi was reused for the object 1927 CH discovered 10 February 1927, by Karl Reinmuth.

References

External links 
 
 

000933
Discoveries by Karl Wilhelm Reinmuth
Named minor planets
19270210